This is a list of bus interchanges or terminals that are part of Singapore's bus system. This list does not include bus stops. Bus terminals and interchanges serve as important nodes in the transport system as bus services start and end at these stations. Those decommissioned due to geographical retention or the introduction of new town centres, or creation of consolidated transportation hubs are mentioned at List of former bus stations in Singapore.

Overview
In the 1970s with the formation of Singapore Bus Service (SBS), the terminals of private companies were inherited by SBS. Many of these terminals were makeshift constructions without adequate facilities. The SBS embarked on a terminal improvement programme to build facilities such more parking space, timekeeper's booths, rest areas for bus crew members, proper platforms with adequate shelter, toilets and food facilities. It also planned to construct new depots and terminals, so as to eliminate parking of buses in residential areas. Makeshift and roadside terminals were to be phased out.

The development of bus terminals was closely linked to town planning in Singapore. Densely inhabited new towns were built along major roads and a bus terminal was allocated at a suitable point inside each of them. Feeder buses were used to carry passengers from inside the new towns to the bus terminal and from thereon, "regular" buses would carry them from the bus terminal to the central business district. With the opening of the MRT system in 1987, the system of using "regular" buses to the central business district was stopped. Bus terminals were built conveniently close to subway stations so as to integrate the subway and bus services. The 1980s also saw the building of larger bus interchanges in new towns, such as the one at Ang Mo Kio which was twice the size of the existing terminal it replaced.

List of interchanges, terminals and depots

Bus interchanges

Bus terminals
Related: Information of bus terminals in Singapore

Depots and bus parks

 Ang Mo Kio Bus Depot
 Bedok North Bus Depot
 Braddell Bus Park 
 Bukit Batok Bus Depot 
 Bulim Bus Depot 
 Hougang Bus Depot 
 Kranji Bus Depot
 Loyang Bus Depot 
 Mandai Bus Depot
 Seletar Bus Depot
 Soon Lee Bus Park
 Ulu Pandan Bus Depot 
 Woodlands Bus Depot

Bus interchanges
There are currently 28 bus interchanges in Singapore, serviced by four bus operators. More have been planned for future housing estates, such as Bidadari, Tampines North and Tengah. As for existing bus interchanges, a number of them have been or are slowly being rebuilt as part of Integrated Transport Hubs, to improve connectivity with the rail network.

Compassvale Bus Interchange
Compassvale Bus Interchange is a bus interchange located along Compassvale Road in Sengkang, Singapore. First announced by the Land Transport Authority in November 2014 as an expansion for the adjacent Sengkang Bus Interchange, the interchange commenced operations on 12 March 2017.

Bus terminals

Buona Vista Bus Terminal

Buona Vista Bus Terminal (location:) is a bus terminal located at Holland Drive in the Buona Vista area of Singapore. The terminal is located adjacent to Buona Vista Community Centre, and close to the Buona Vista MRT station. Unlike most other terminals, it does not allow passenger boarding or alighting on the site itself.

Previously, the Buona Vista area was served by the Commonwealth Avenue Terminal, located at the intersection of Commonwealth Avenue and North Buona Vista Road. Due to the construction of the Commonwealth Avenue extension in the 1970s, a portion of the terminal was affected, resulting in the creation of a temporary terminal at Holland Drive. The temporary Holland Drive terminal (located next to the City Shuttle Service terminus), started operating in November 1975 for certain bus routes. In 1982, SBS had to vacate the Commonwealth Avenue terminal and move to a temporary terminal called North Buona Vista Terminal. By the late 1980s, the present Buona Vista terminal had become operational, and bus services to the nearby Ayer Rajah Industrial Estate were introduced.

Changi Airport Bus Terminal
The Changi Airport Passenger Terminal Building (PTB) Bus Terminals (Malay:Terminal Bas Lapangan Terbang,) are bus termini located at the basement of each of Singapore Changi Airport's terminals (1, 2 and 3). The termini at Terminals 2 and 3 are connected to the Changi Airport MRT station.

Unlike typical terminals in Singapore, bus services do not stop for extended periods, due to the lack of bus parking facilities. Buses looping at Changi Airport first stop at PTB3 terminal, before proceeding to PTB1 and PTB2. Due to heightened security concerns, buses can only enter the basements after auxiliary police officers have physically boarded and inspected them.

Some berths are reserved at the terminal for Singapore Police Force and Changi International Airport Services vehicles.

Changi Village Bus Terminal
Changi Village Bus Terminal was opened in 1975 to take over operations from the former smaller road side Changi Point Bus Terminal. It was built over the site of the former Changi Cinema. The bus terminal comprises a small boarding and alighting berth area for bus services that is directly adjacent to the hawker centre. The bus terminal continues to be operated by SBS Transit despite its close location to the areas where Go-Ahead Group bus services operate.

Ghim Moh Bus Terminal 
Ghim Moh Bus Terminal is a bus terminal located in Ghim Moh along Ghim Moh Road with a small bus park behind the terminal. The terminal is now one of the few surviving terminals of the 1970s era in which it was common for terminals to be built along the roadside with only a small booth for bus captains to report to when completing their duties. The terminal allows boarding and alighting at a bus stop along the road and serves the residents of Buona Vista and Ghim Moh as well as those in the Mount Sinai housing estate.

Before the consolidation of bus routes to operate to and from major interchanges, roadside terminals were very common, especially in the seventies. Ghim Moh Bus Terminal was no exception, and opened in the late 1970s to complement the building of Ghim Moh Estate. The terminal was situated adjacent to Block 9 and 10. In 1986, the bus terminal was relocated to a bus bay outside Block 9 along Ghim Moh Road when the existing bus terminal was converted into a car park. One of the car park entrances was sealed off and functions as a turnabout point for buses entering from Commonwealth Avenue West. An alighting bay was also near the turnabout point, opposite a refuse collection point.

In 2006, the HDB announced SERS redevelopment scheme for Blocks 9, 9A, 10, 11, 12 and 12A. The blocks were slated to be demolished and then redeveloped. In early 2012, the blocks of flats were vacated and were demolished in 2013.

Jurong Island Bus Terminal

Jurong Island Bus Terminal is a bus terminal on the southwest of Jurong Island, Singapore, serving the only form of public transport on the offshore island off the southwest coast of the main island.

The terminal was located near Oasis@Sakra, the amenity centre on the island. Initially, JTC provided shuttle bus services to and from Jurong East MRT station. Later SBS started public bus services to Jurong Island. In 2002, two Jurong Island services were notable for being the first routes to use CNG powered buses in Singapore. However, SBS later stopped operating these services. Since then transportation to the island has been provided by private companies.

Kent Ridge Bus Terminal
Kent Ridge Bus Terminal (Chinese: 肯特岗巴士终站) is a bus station located at Kent Ridge, in the west of Singapore. This bus terminal sits at a corner of the National University of Singapore (NUS) Kent Ridge campus, at the corner of Eusoff Hall and mainly serves as a transfer point for NUS students to other parts of Singapore. The terminal primarily serves as a terminating point for bus routes serving the NUS campus and residential developments around Pasir Panjang and West Coast. Apart from regular public bus services, NUS Internal Shuttle Bus routes also call at the terminal.

Opened on 16 August 1981, the terminal has a single vehicular concourse area, with separate entrance and exit leading to Clementi Road. The terminal has a sheltered bus stop that functions as both a boarding and alighting point, and a bus park in the middle of the terminal for the layover of buses. A terminal building contains an office and a driver’s lounge. As a layover point for several NUS ISB routes, an electronic driver’s log-in kiosk for ComfortDelGro Bus (the NUS shuttle bus operator) is also located at the terminal.

Lorong 1 Geylang Bus Terminal

Lorong 1 Geylang Bus Terminal is a bus terminal located in Kallang. It sits between Geylang Road and Sims Avenue, opposite Kallang MRT station and beside the Kallang River.

The terminal was originally a fringe car park. In 1975, it was planned as a Park and Ride terminal. Under the Park and Ride scheme, drivers could park their cars and then ride the City Shuttle Service to the Central Business District. The services ran daily (except Sunday) during peak hours for 50 cents a ride. However, the Park and Ride Scheme did not prove to be very popular. Due to low ridership, the terminal was converted to a public bus terminal in 1988 and handed over to SBS Transit and Trans-Island Bus Services. In 1998, Crawford Street Bus Terminal was shutdown and its bus services were relocated to this terminal.

In November 2015, it was reported that the terminal housed some of the last DAF buses which were still in use by SMRT Buses, which is now being replaced by newer buses.

Marina Centre Bus Terminal
Marina Centre Bus Terminal is a bus terminal located along Raffles Boulevard in Marina Centre, Singapore. It was opened on 30 November 1986. It is near Promenade MRT station and directly under Benjamin Sheares Bridge. The bus terminal does not allow boarding or alighting. The final alighting stop for bus services bound for Marina Centre Bus Terminal is the bus stop outside Pan Pacific Hotel. The first boarding stop for buses leaving the terminal is the bus stop after the Singapore Flyer.

In June 2015, the Marina Centre Bus Terminal Expansion opened together with a public coach park. There are 13 lots for SBS Transit and Tower Transit buses and 4 marked as 'Reserved.' As of June 2015, there are bus parking lots at the roadside of the terminal occupied by SMRT buses.

Queen Street Bus Terminal
Queen Street Bus Terminal (Malay: Pertukaran Bas Queen Street,
location), also known as Ban San Bus Terminal, is a bus terminal in Singapore. Queen Street Bus Terminal serves as the terminal for cross-border bus and taxi services to Johor Bahru, Malaysia. It opened on 13 October 1985.

Saint Michael's Bus Terminal

Saint Michael's Bus Terminal, (Malay: Pertukaran Bas Saint Michael's, location:
) abbreviated to St. Michael's Ter, is a bus terminal located in the subzone of Balestier in Novena, Singapore. Despite its name, the terminal is not located near St. Michael's Road, but is bordered by Whampoa Road, Kim Keat Road, Whampoa Park Connector and the Sungei Whampoa, within the Whampoa estate.

Opened on 26 May 1985, the terminal has a single combined entrance and exit located along Whampoa Road. All berths are end-on, and are used for both loading/unloading passengers and parking of buses.

History
In the 1970s, Saint Michael's Bus Terminal used to house 2 bus services from Singapore Shuttle Bus (Pte) Ltd, which have since been withdrawn in 2003, upon SBS Transit taking over the terminal.

In 2011, the terminal was renovated and refurbished to provide full wheelchair accessibility for wheelchair-bound passengers. This included the installation of wheelchair ramps for every bus berth. In 2014, addition and alteration works were carried out under LTA Contract VT353, which was awarded to TQC Builders Pte. Ltd. in April 2013. The contract included to installation and construction of a new annexe at the terminal, with public restrooms, a driver's lounge and ancillary rooms, built on the space once occupied by the excess bus parking spaces; new rain shades, seating and wall mounted fans were also installed, with a new coat of paint applied to the structure.

Sims Place Bus Terminal
Sims Place Bus Terminal (Chinese: 沈氏坊巴士终站, Malay: Pertukaran Bas Sims Place,) is a roadside bus terminal located in Geylang, Singapore. The bus terminal is situated near a market and several flats. The nearest MRT station is Aljunied. The terminal is one of the few surviving terminals of the 1970s, in which it was common for terminals to be built along the roadside with only a small booth for bus captains to report to when completing their duties.

Upper East Coast Bus Terminal
Upper East Coast Terminal (Malay: Pertukaran Bas Upper East Coast,) is a bus terminal located along Upper East Coast Road, in the Bedok planning area, Singapore. The terminal was opened in 2001 after the closure of the Marine Parade Bus Terminal. In April 2017, Services 25 & 55 were extended here from Bedok and Siglap Road respectively after the terminal expansion was completed in 2017, along with the expansion of Hougang and Punggol Bus interchanges, in order to accommodate new services under the Bus Service Enhancement Programme (BSEP).

See also
 List of former bus stations in Singapore

References

External links
 
 

Bus stations in Singapore
Singapore
Bus stations